Erect may refer to:
 Erect (position), something having an essentially upright position or vertical habit
 Erect, North Carolina, an unincorporated community in Randolph County, United States
 Erect image, an image that appears right-side up in optics
 Erect the Youth Problem, the only album released by American punk trio Wives

See also
 
 Erection (disambiguation)
 Erecta, a feminine Latin word meaning erect
 Erectum (disambiguation), a neuter Latin word meaning erect
 Erectus (disambiguation), a masculine Latin word meaning erect
 List of plant morphology terms
 Glossary of botanical terms